Khashm el Girba Airport  is an airport serving the town of Khashm el Girba and the Khashm el Girba Dam in Sudan.

See also
Transport in Sudan

References

 OurAirports - Sudan
   Great Circle Mapper - Khashm el Girba
 Khashm el Girba
 Google Earth

Airports in Sudan